Self-help may refer to:

 Samopomich (translates to "Self-help"), political party in Ukraine
self-help, self-guided improvement economically, intellectually, or emotionally, most frequently with a substantial psychological or spiritual basis
Self-help (law), individuals' implementation of their rights without resorting to legal writ or consultation of higher authority
Self-Help (album), album released by the metalcore band Spitfire
"Self Help (Space Ghost Coast to Coast)", an episode of Space Ghost Coast to Coast
"Self Help" (The Walking Dead), an episode of the television series The Walking Dead
Center for Community Self-Help, leading Community Development Financial Institution

Books
Self-help book, book intended as a help in self-improvement of the reader
Self-Help (book), book published in 1859 by Samuel Smiles
Self-Help (short stories), 1985 short story collection by Lorrie Moore
Self Help (novel), novel published in 2007 by Edward Docx